Leonardo Esteban Monje Valenzuela (born 16 March 1981) is a Chilean former footballer who played as a striker.

Personal life
His son, Joaquín, is a professional footballer who was with the Unión Española youth ranks and then moved to Coquimbo Unido since his father played at the club.

Honours

Club
 Universidad de Concepción
 Copa Chile (1): 2014–15

Individual
Primera División de Chile Top-scorer (1): 2006 Clausura

References

External links

1981 births
Living people
People from Temuco
Chilean footballers
Chilean expatriate footballers
Chile international footballers
Club Deportivo Universidad Católica footballers
Everton de Viña del Mar footballers
Santiago Morning footballers
Club Deportivo Palestino footballers
C.D. Antofagasta footballers
Audax Italiano footballers
Deportes Magallanes footballers
Puerto Montt footballers
Universidad de Concepción footballers
Deportes Concepción (Chile) footballers
C.D. Huachipato footballers
Unión Española footballers
Rosario Central footballers
Deportes Iquique footballers
C.S.D. Municipal players
Coquimbo Unido footballers
Magallanes footballers
Chilean Primera División players
Primera B de Chile players
Primera Nacional players
Liga Nacional de Fútbol de Guatemala players
Chilean expatriate sportspeople in Argentina
Chilean expatriate sportspeople in Guatemala
Expatriate footballers in Argentina
Expatriate footballers in Guatemala
Association football forwards